Doxibetasol (doxybetasol; developmental code name GR 2/443) is a synthetic glucocorticoid corticosteroid.

References

Diketones
Diols
Fluoroarenes
Glucocorticoids
Pregnanes